Juan Manuel Delgado Moreno (born 13 January 1977), known as Juanma, is a Spanish retired footballer who played as a central defender.

He amassed La Liga totals of 138 games and seven goals over the course of seven seasons, representing in the competition Racing de Santander and Deportivo.

Football career
Born in Huelva, Andalusia, Juanma started his professional career with local Recreativo de Huelva in 1997. Two years later he signed for Atlético Madrid, but spent the vast majority of his stint with the B-team and left after one season for UD Salamanca, also in the second division; however, in January 2001, he signed for Racing de Santander, making his debut in La Liga on the 14th in a 0–1 home loss against Málaga CF.

Juanma was manager Joaquín Caparrós' first signing for Deportivo de La Coruña when he joined in July 2005 from Racing in a free transfer. In a 26 October home feature against Real Madrid he scored twice as Depor prevailed 3–1, and netted four goals in 23 games during the campaign.

In 2006–07, however, after Portuguese Jorge Andrade fully recovered from injury, Juanma would be virtually absent from the team's first eleven. After some transfer speculation he moved to second level club CD Tenerife for the following season, being released midway through his second year.

In January 2009, Juanma signed with Cádiz CF in division three, but was waived seven months later, retiring in the summer at the age of 32.

References

External links

1977 births
Living people
Footballers from Huelva
Spanish footballers
Association football defenders
La Liga players
Segunda División players
Segunda División B players
Tercera División players
Recreativo de Huelva players
Atlético Madrid B players
Atlético Madrid footballers
UD Salamanca players
Racing de Santander players
Deportivo de La Coruña players
CD Tenerife players
Cádiz CF players